Hamish MacDonald may refer to:
Hamish Macdonald (Athlete) (Born 1999), New Zealand Off-road Motorcyclist
Hamish Macdonald (broadcaster), Australian news presenter and journalist
Hamish MacDonald (athlete) (born 1974), Australian Paralympian
Hamish MacDonald (author), Canadian born Scottish author and Indie publisher
Hamish Macdonald (rugby union) (born 1947), New Zealand rugby union player
Hamish Macdonald (artist) (1935–2008), Scottish painter

See also
Hamish McDonald, Australian author and journalist